Operation Hailstone was a massive United States Navy air and surface attack on Truk Lagoon on 17–18 February 1944, conducted as part of the American offensive drive against the Imperial Japanese Navy in the Pacific Ocean theatre.

Background

The Japanese occupied Micronesia, including the Caroline Islands, in 1914, and established Truk as a base as early as 1939. The lagoon was first built up to house the IJN's 4th Fleet, its "South Seas Force". After the outbreak of war with the United States, the 4th Fleet was put under the command of the Combined Fleet, which continued to use Truk as a forward operating base into 1944. In addition to anchorages for warships, and port facilities for shipping between the home islands and the Southern Resources Area, five airfields and a seaplane base were constructed at Truk, making it the only major Japanese airfield within flying range of the Marshall Islands.

Despite the impressions of U.S. Navy leaders and the American public concerning Truk's projected fortifications, the base was never significantly reinforced or protected against land attack. In fact, the development of Truk began in earnest, and in hurried fashion, only in late 1943, when the airfields were extended, shore batteries were erected, and other defensive measures taken against a U.S. invasion.

Because aircraft stationed at Truk could potentially interfere with the upcoming invasion of Eniwetok, and because Truk had recently served as a ferry point for the resupply of aircraft to Rabaul, Admiral Raymond Spruance ordered Vice Admiral Marc Mitscher's Fast Carrier Task Force, designated TF 58, to carry out air raids against Truk. Three of TF 58's four carrier task groups were committed to the operation. Their total strength consisted of five fleet carriers (and ) and four light carriers (and ), carrying a total of 500+ warplanes. Supporting these aircraft carriers was a task force of seven battleships, and numerous heavy cruisers, light cruisers, 28 destroyers, and submarines.

The Japanese, meanwhile, understood the weakness of their position at Truk. The IJN had begun withdrawing fleet units from its anchorages as early as October 1943. The effective abandonment of Truk as a forward operating base accelerated during the first week of February 1944, following Japanese sightings of U.S. Marine Corps PB4Y-1 Liberator reconnaissance planes sent to reconnoiter the area.

Attack

The three carrier task groups committed to Hailstone moved into position and began launching their first fighter sweep 90 minutes before daybreak on 17 February 1944. No Japanese air patrol was active at the time, as the IJN's 22nd and 26th Air Flotillas were enjoying shore leave after weeks on high alert following the Liberator sightings. Similarly problematic for the Japanese, radar on Truk was not capable of detecting low-flying planes — a weakness probably known and exploited by Allied intelligence organizations. Because of these factors, U.S. carrier aircraft achieved total surprise.

Japanese pilots scrambled into their cockpits just minutes before TF 58 planes arrived over Eten, Param, Moen, and Dublon Islands. Though more than 300 Imperial Japanese Navy Air Service (IJNAS) and Imperial Japanese Army Air Service (IJAAS) planes were present at Truk on the first day of attacks, only about half of them were operational compared with over 500 operational aircraft among the carriers of TF 58. U.S. Navy fighter pilots in their Grumman F6F Hellcats, with the advantages of speed, altitude, armor, and surprise, achieved a one–sided victory against IJNAS pilots flying the outdated Mitsubishi A6M Zero. As many as 30 of the 80 Zeros sent up in response to the fighter sweep were shot down, compared with four Hellcats reported lost. Only token aerial resistance was encountered for the rest of the morning; almost no Japanese aircraft were present by the afternoon.

Due to the lack of air cover or warning, many merchant ships were caught at anchor with only the islands' anti-aircraft guns for defense against the U.S. carrier planes. Some vessels outside the lagoon already steaming towards Japan were attacked by U.S. submarines and sunk before they could make their escape. Still others, attempting to flee via the atoll's North Pass, were bottled up by aerial attack and by Admiral Spruance's surface force, Task Group 50.9, which circumnavigated Truk, bombarding shore positions and engaging enemy ships.

Torpedo bomber and dive bomber squadrons from the carrier air groups (CAGs) were responsible for the bulk of the damage inflicted on Japanese ground facilities. Early on the first day of Hailstone, Grumman TBF Avenger torpedo bomber squadrons from Enterprises Carrier Air Group 10 (CAG-10) and Intrepids CAG-6 dropped fragmentation and incendiary bombs on runways at Eten Island and the seaplane base on Moen Island. Dozens of aircraft were damaged or destroyed, further blunting any possible response by the Japanese to the strikes. Subsequent joint attacks by dive bombers and Avenger torpedo bombers cratered runways and destroyed hangar facilities.

Morning strikes were also launched against shipping targets in the lagoon. Lieutenant Commander (later Rear Admiral) James D. Ramage, commanding officer of Dive Bombing Squadron 10 (VB-10), is credited with sinking the previously damaged merchant tanker Hoyo Maru. Lieutenant James E. Bridges and his crew in one of Intrepids Torpedo Squadron 6 (VT-6) Avengers scored a direct hit on the ammunition ship . The bomb blast set off a tremendous explosion, which immediately sank the ship and apparently engulfed the plane, as well, killing all three men inside.

By the second and third anti-shipping strikes of the day, CAG action reports listed the apparent enemy mission as "escape". Those ships able to make for open sea steamed for the North Pass exit from the lagoon while weathering repeated aerial attacks. One particular group of warships—cruiser Katori, auxiliary cruiser Akagi Maru, destroyers Maikaze and Nowaki, and minesweeper Shonan Maru—was given special attention by carrier bombers. Multiple air groups attacked these ships, inflicting serious damage. Akagi Maru was sunk by air attacks.

At this point, reports reached Admiral Spruance concerning the group of warships fleeing through North Pass. Spruance was so adamant on engaging in ship-to-ship combat that his carrier commander, Admiral Mitscher, ordered his CAGs to stop attacking Katori and her companions. The battered Japanese ships did not stand much of a chance against Task Group 50.9, though members of his staff saw Spruance's decision to engage in surface action when aircraft likely could have achieved similar results as needlessly reckless. Indeed, the Japanese destroyer Maikaze managed to fire torpedoes at the battleship New Jersey during the engagement. Fortunately for Spruance, the torpedoes missed, and the "battle" ended with predictably one–sided results. The U.S. Navy surface combatants incurred virtually no damage, and it was the only time in their careers that Iowa and New Jersey had fired their main armament at enemy ships. Meanwhile, New Jersey's 5-inch (127 mm) guns combined fire with US cruisers to sink Maikaze and Shonan Maru, while Iowa targeted and sank Katori with numerous hits from her main battery. Nowaki was the only Japanese ship from this group to escape, only suffering very minor damage at the hand of a straddle from a High Capacity 16-inch (406 mm) round from Iowa.

Retaliation for the day's strikes arrived late at night in the form of small groups of Japanese bombers probing the task groups' defenses. From roughly 21:00, on 17 February, to just minutes past midnight on 18 February, at least five groups of between one and three enemy planes attempted to sneak past screening ships to strike at the fleet carriers. One such plane, a Nakajima B5N2 "Kate" bomber, managed to evade night fighter planes protecting the U.S. task force and dropped its torpedo on Task Group 58.2. The torpedo struck Intrepid on the starboard quarter of the ship, damaging steering control and killing 11 sailors. Intrepid was forced to retire to the U.S. for repairs and did not return to combat until August 1944.

Aftermath
Truk, like so many other Japanese bases, was left to itself without hope of resupply or reinforcement. Army forces, which had arrived at the atoll before the U.S. attacks, put increasing strain on available foodstuffs and medical supplies. Dwindling ammunition even limited the ability of shore batteries to fend off intermittent attacks by Allied forces, including experimental raids by Boeing B-29 Superfortresses and attacks by Allied carrier aircraft.

Losses at Truk were severe. Some 17,000 tons of stored fuel were destroyed by the strikes. Shipping losses totaled almost 200,000 tons, including precious resources in fleet oilers. This represented almost one-tenth of total Japanese shipping losses between 1 November 1943 and 30 June 1944. Moreover, the isolation of this whole area of operations by submarine and air attack began the effective severance of Japanese shipping lanes between empire waters and critical fuel supplies to the south. The ultimate effect of such a disconnect was later seen during the Battle of Leyte Gulf, when IJN forces had to sortie separately from Japan and Lingga Roads due to fuel constraints. The neutralization of Truk, and the seizure of Eniwetok, paved the way for the upcoming invasion of Saipan, which for the first time put U.S. land-based heavy bombers within range of the Japanese home islands.

Japan started to rebuild Truk as a bomber air base and increased its anti-aircraft defenses. Spruance sent in carrier planes again on April 29, 1944, and destroyed AA and bombers parked at airports. British forces attacked again in June 1945. No significant naval buildup occurred at Truk after Operation Hailstone.

Truk is renowned today as a tourist destination for divers interested in seeing the many shipwrecks left in the lagoon, many of which were sunk in Operation Hailstone.

List of ships in Truk at the time of attack

Warships
List derived from Jeffery's War Graves, Munition Dumps and Pleasure Grounds (2007)

Sunk
 Cruiser (CL)
 Katori (香取) 5,800 tons
 Naka (那珂) 5,195 tons
 Destroyer (DD)
 1 modern
 Maikaze (舞風) 陽炎型 2,000 tons
 3 obsolescent
 Fumizuki (文月) 睦月型 1,320 tons
 Oite (追風) 神風型 1,270 tons
 Tachikaze (太刀風) 峯風型 1,215 tons
 Submarine chaser
 CH-29, 440 tons
 CH-24, 440 tons
 Auxiliary submarine chaser Shonan Maru #15 (第15昭南丸), 355 tons
 Motor torpedo boat #10, 85 tons

Damaged
 Repair ship Akashi (明石) 10,500 tons
 Seaplane tender Akitsushima (秋津洲) 4,650 tons
 Destroyer (DD)
 Matsukaze (松風) 神風型 1,400 tons
 Shigure (時雨) 白露型 1,685 tons
 Submarine
 I-10 (伊10), 2,919 tons
 RO-42, 1,115 tons
 Submarine chaser CHa-20
 Target ship Hakachi (波勝) 1,641 tons

Merchant ships
List derived from Jeffery's War Graves, Munition Dumps and Pleasure Grounds (2007)

Sunk
 Auxiliary cruiser
 Aikoku Maru (愛国丸) 10,348 tons
 Akagi Maru (赤城丸) 7,367 tons
 Kiyosumi Maru (清澄丸) 6,983 tons
 Navy transport
 Hoki Maru (伯耆丸) 7,112 tons
 Yamagiri Maru (山霧丸) 7,112 tons
 Fujikawa Maru (富士川丸) 6,938 tons
 Navy transport/freighter San Francisco Maru (桑港丸) 5,831 tons
 Reiyo Maru (麗洋丸) 5,446 tons
 Seiko Maru (西江丸)? 5,385 tons
 passenger/cargo ship Kensho Maru (乾祥丸) 4,862 tons
 freighter Hanakawa Maru (花川丸) 4,739 tons
 passenger/cargo ship Sankisan Maru or Yamakisan Maru (山鬼山丸) 4,776 tons
 freighter Hokuyo Maru (北洋丸) 4,217 tons
 freighter Momokawa Maru (桃川丸) 3,829 tons
 Navy water carrier/passenger/cargo ship Nippo Maru (日豊丸) 3,764 tons
 freighter Unkai Maru #6(第六雲海丸) 3,220 tons
 Taiho Maru (大邦丸) 2,827 tons
 freighter Shotan Maru (松丹丸) 1,999 tons
 freighter Gosei Maru (五星丸) 1,931 tons
 Freighter Taikichi Maru or Tachi Maru (泰吉丸) 1,891 tons
 Army transport
 Gyoten Maru (暁天丸) 6,854 tons
 freighter Nagano Maru (長野丸) 3,824 tons
 Yubae Maru (夕映丸) 3,217 tons
 Submarine tender
 Heian Maru (平安丸) 11,614 tons
 Rio de Janeiro Maru (リオデジャネイロ丸) 9,626 tons
 Oiler 
 Fleet oiler Shinkoku Maru (神国丸) 10,020 tons
 Oil tanker Fujisan Maru (富士山丸) 9,524 tons
 Auxiliary oil tanker
 whaler Tonan Maru #3 (第三図南丸) 19,209 tons
 Houyou Maru or Hoyo Maru (宝洋丸) 8,691 tons
 passenger/cargo ship Amagisan Maru (天城山丸) 7,620 tons

Damaged
 Cargo ship Sōya (宗谷) 3,800 tons

See also
Operation Inmate
US Naval Base Carolines
Naval Base Eniwetok
Naval Base  Gilbert Islands 
Naval Base  Marshall Islands

Notes

References

Bibliography

Primary sources

Further reading

-Firsthand account of Operation Hailstone by a crewmember of USS New Orleans.

Video
 Quest for Sunken Warships: "Operation Hailstone", 2007, documentary, Military Channel, last aired 30 September 2010, 4-5pm MDT.

External links

Pacific Ocean theatre of World War II
History of the Federated States of Micronesia
South Seas Mandate in World War II
Articles containing video clips
February 1944 events
Naval battles of World War II involving the United States
World War II aerial operations and battles of the Pacific theatre